Jean Marie Okutu Kouletio (born 4 August 1988 in Cotonou, Benin) is a Spanish athlete specialising in the long jump. He made the final at the 2015 European Indoor Championships, finishing fifth. In addition he won the silver medal at the 2012 Ibero-American Championships.

Although Okutu was born in Benin, his family comes from Ghana; his father, a sailor was working in a port in Cotonou. At the age of six, Jean Marie moved with his family to Marín, Spain.

His personal bests in the event are 8.01 metres outdoors (+1.7 m/s; Pontevedra 2014) and 7.96 metres indoors (Antequera 2015).

Competition record

References

1988 births
Living people
People from Cotonou
Beninese emigrants to Spain
Naturalised citizens of Spain
Sportspeople from Marín, Pontevedra
Sportspeople from Galicia (Spain)
Spanish male long jumpers
Athletes (track and field) at the 2016 Summer Olympics
Olympic athletes of Spain
Athletes (track and field) at the 2018 Mediterranean Games
Mediterranean Games competitors for Spain
Spanish people of Ghanaian descent
Spanish sportspeople of African descent